Gayevka is a rural locality (a khutor) in Volokonovsky District, Belgorod Oblast, Russia. The population was 11 as of 2010. There is 1 street.

Geography 
Gayevka is located 32 km west of Volokonovka (the district's administrative centre) by road. Volchy-Vtoroy is the nearest rural locality.

References 

Rural localities in Volokonovsky District